Leonhard Gottlieb Karl von Stryk (3 February 1834 – 1882) was a Baltic German historian and author.

Biography
He was born on 3 February 1834 in Livonia to Wilhelm von Stryk (1803-?) and Eleonora von Mensenkampff (1798–1876). He studied law at the Imperial University of Dorpat from 1853 to 1856. On 21 December 1876 he married Amalie von Aline Fölkersahmiga (1850–1914). He died in 1882 in Dresden.

Publications
 Livländische Güter-Geschichte (1876)
 Beiträge zur Geschichte der Rittergüter Livlands. Erster Teil (1877)
 Beiträge zur Geschichte der Rittergüter Livlands. Zweiter Teil, Der lettische District (1885)

1834 births
1882 deaths
19th-century German historians
Baltic-German people
19th-century German male writers
German male non-fiction writers
Emigrants from the Russian Empire to Germany
University of Tartu alumni